Handan is a Turkish name. Notable people with the name include:

Handan Sultan (died 1605), concubine of Ottoman Sultan Mehmed III, mother and Valide Sultan of Sultan Ahmed I.
Handan Biroğlu (born 1981), Turkish Paralympian female archer
Handan İpekçi (born 1956), Turkish screenwriter and film director
Handan Kara (1939–2017), Turkish classical music singer
Handan Kurğa (born 1993), Turkish women's footballer

See also
Handanovič, Bosnian surname derived from the given name

Turkish feminine given names